"Really Love You" is a song written by Paul McCartney and Ringo Starr—their first-ever shared credit—and originally released on McCartney's 1997 album Flaming Pie. In 2005, a reworked version was released as a limited edition 12" vinyl, from the album Twin Freaks.

The song was written during a jam session the day after McCartney and Starr recorded "Beautiful Night", another song on Flaming Pie that features Starr on drums.

Personnel
Personnel per Flaming Pie booklet

Paul McCartney – lead vocal, backing vocal, bass guitar, electric guitar, Wurlitzer piano
Jeff Lynne – backing vocal, electric guitar
Ringo Starr – drums

See also
"Angel in Disguise"

References

1997 songs
2005 singles
Paul McCartney songs
Parlophone singles
Songs written by Paul McCartney
Songs written by Ringo Starr
Song recordings produced by Paul McCartney
Song recordings produced by Jeff Lynne
Song recordings produced by Roy Kerr (mashup artist)
Music published by Startling Music
Music published by MPL Music Publishing